Eduardo Herrera may refer to:

 Eduardo Herrera (golfer) (born 1965), Colombian golfer
 Eduardo Herrera (footballer, born 1988), Mexican footballer
 Eduardo Mendoza Herrera (born 1993), Mexican footballer
 Eduardo Herrera (Chilean footballer) (born 1944)
 Eduardo Herrera (Venezuelan footballer) (born 1993), Venezuelan football goalkeeper